Scopula nigralba is a moth of the  family Geometridae. It is found in Cameroon.

References

Moths described in 1978
nigralba
Moths of Africa